Sukuta is a town located in the Western Division of the Gambia. It had a population of 16,667 as of the 1993 census.

Populated places in the Gambia